Navia saxicola is a plant species in the genus Navia. This species is endemic to Venezuela.

References

saxicola
Flora of Venezuela